Hiatulopsis is a genus of two species of fungi in the family Agaricaceae. The genus was circumscribed in 1967 by mycologists K. Grinling and Rolf Singer with H. amara as the type species. H. aureoflava was added to the genus by Singer in 1989.

See also
List of Agaricaceae genera
List of Agaricales genera

References

Agaricaceae
Agaricales genera
Taxa named by Rolf Singer